Michael Matteo Rossi (born June 1, 1987) is an American film director, writer, and producer.

He is most known for his action thriller film Chase, released through Vertical Entertainment starring Damien Puckler, Aries Spears and Jessica Morris and won the Best Action Feature award at the Hollywood Reel Film festival.

Rossi is also known for his feature Misogynist, which starred Jonathan Bennett, Eve Mauro and Tracey Bregman and won best narrative feature at the Los Angeles Underground Film Festival.

Rossi was a producer of the film The Handler, an action movie.

References 

1987 births
Living people